Fenugreek (Trigonella foenum-graecum) is an annual plant in the family Fabaceae, with leaves consisting of three small obovate to oblong leaflets. It is cultivated worldwide as a semiarid crop. Its seeds and leaves are common ingredients in dishes from the Indian subcontinent, and have been used as a culinary ingredient since ancient times. Its use as a food ingredient in small quantities is safe.

Although sold as a dietary supplement, there is no clinical evidence that fenugreek has therapeutic properties. Commonly used in traditional medicine, fenugreek can increase the risk of serious adverse effects, including allergic reactions.

History
Fenugreek is believed to have been brought into cultivation in the Near East. It is uncertain which wild strain of the genus Trigonella gave rise to domesticated fenugreek. Charred fenugreek seeds have been recovered from Tell Halal, Iraq (carbon dated to 4000 BC), and Bronze Age levels of Lachish and desiccated seeds from the tomb of Tutankhamen. Cato the Elder lists fenugreek with clover and vetch as crops grown to feed cattle.

In one first-century A.D. recipe, the Romans flavoured wine with fenugreek. In the 1st century AD, in Galilee, it was grown as a staple food, as Josephus mentions it in his book, the Wars of the Jews. The plant is mentioned in the 2nd-century compendium of Jewish Oral Law (Mishnah) under its Hebrew name tiltan.

Etymology
The English name derives via Middle French fenugrec from Latin faenugraecum, faenum Graecum meaning "Greek hay".

Production
India is a major producer of fenugreek, and over 80% of India's output is from Rajasthan.

Uses

Fenugreek is used as a herb (dried or fresh leaves), spice (seeds), and vegetable (fresh leaves, sprouts, and microgreens). Sotolon is the chemical responsible for the distinctive maple syrup smell of fenugreek.

Cuboid, yellow- to amber-coloured fenugreek seeds are frequently encountered in the cuisines of the Indian subcontinent, used both whole and powdered in the preparation of pickles, vegetable dishes, dal, and spice mixes such as panch phoron and sambar powder. They are often roasted to reduce inherent bitterness and to enhance flavour.

Cooking 

Fresh fenugreek leaves are an ingredient in some curries, such as with potatoes in cuisines of the Indian subcontinent to make "aloo methi" ("potato fenugreek") curry.

In Armenian cuisine, fenugreek seed powder is used to make a paste that is an important ingredient to cover dried and cured beef to make basturma.

In Iranian cuisine, fenugreek leaves are called shanbalileh. They are one of several greens incorporated into the herb stew ghormeh sabzi, the herb frittata kuku sabzi and a soup known as eshkeneh.  

In Georgian cuisine, a related species—Trigonella caerulea called "blue fenugreek"—is used.  

In Egyptian cuisine, fenugreek is known by the Arabic name hilba or helba حلبة. Seeds are boiled to make a drink that is consumed at home, as well as in coffee shops. Peasants in Upper Egypt add fenugreek seeds and maize to their pita bread to produce aish merahrah, a staple of their diet. Basterma, a cured dried beef, has its distinctive flavour from the fenugreek used as a coating.

In Moroccan cuisine, fenugreek is used in Rfissa, a dish associated with the countryside. 

Fenugreek is used in Eritrean and Ethiopian cuisine. The word for fenugreek in Amharic is abesh (or abish), and the seed is used in Ethiopia as a natural herbal medicine in the treatment of diabetes.

In Turkish cuisine, fenugreek seed powder is 'çemen' and used to make a paste with paprika powder and garlic that is an essential ingredient to cover dried and cured beef to make pastirma/basturma which comes from Turkish verb 'bastırmak' means to press.</ref>

Yemenite Jews following the interpretation of Rabbi Shelomo Yitzchak (Rashi) believe fenugreek, which they call hilbah, hilbeh, hilba, helba, or halba "חילבה", to be the Talmudic rubia. When the seed kernels are ground and mixed with water they greatly expand; hot spices, turmeric and lemon juice are added to produce a frothy relish eaten with a sop. The relish is also called hilbeh; it is reminiscent of curry. It is eaten daily and ceremonially during the meal of the first and/or second night of the Jewish New Year, Rosh Hashana.

In Yemen, a small amount of Oud Al Hilba (عود الحلبة), which appears to be the same as Ashwagandha, is traditionally added to ground Fenugreek seeds before they are mixed with water to prepare the Hulbah paste. This is believed to aid in digestion and more importantly to prevent or lessen the maple-syrup smell that usually occurs when consuming Fenugreek.

Nutritional profile

In a 100 gram reference amount, fenugreek seeds provide  of food energy and contain 9% water, 58% carbohydrates, 23% protein, and 6% fat, with calcium at 40% of the Daily Value (DV, table). Fenugreek seeds (per 100 grams) are a rich source of protein (46% DV), dietary fiber, B vitamins, and dietary minerals, particularly manganese (59% DV) and iron (262% DV) (table).

Dietary supplement
Fenugreek dietary supplements are manufactured from powdered seeds into capsules, loose powders, teas, and liquid extracts in many countries. Powders may also be used as a topical medication or dressing for skin wounds or eczema. There is no high-quality evidence that these products have any clinical effectiveness.

Animal feed
Fenugreek is sometimes used as animal feed. It provides a green fodder palatable to ruminants. The seeds are also used to feed fish and domestic rabbits.

Food additive
Fenugreek seeds and leaves contain the molecule sotolone, which imparts the aroma of fenugreek and curry in high concentrations, and maple syrup or caramel in lower concentrations. Fenugreek is used as a flavoring agent in imitation maple syrup or tea, and as a dietary supplement.

Research
Constituents of fenugreek seeds include flavonoids, alkaloids, coumarins, vitamins, and saponins; the most prevalent alkaloid is trigonelline and coumarins include cinnamic acid and scopoletin. Research into whether fenugreek reduces biomarkers in people with diabetes and with pre-diabetic conditions is of limited quality. 

As of 2020, there was no high-quality evidence for whether fenugreek is safe and effective to relieve dysmenorrhea or improve lactation during breastfeeding. Studies of fenugreek are characterized as having variable, poor experimental design and quality, including small numbers of subjects, failure to describe methods, inconsistency and duration of dosing, and non-recording of adverse effects.

Because research on potential biological effects of consuming fenugreek has provided no high-quality evidence for health or anti-disease effect, fenugreek is not approved or recommended for clinical use by the United States Food and Drug Administration.

Traditional medicine
Although once a folk remedy for an insufficient milk supply when nursing, there is no good evidence that fenugreek is effective or safe for this use. There is no good evidence it is useful in traditional practices for treating dysmennorhea, inflammation, diabetes, or any human disorder.

Adverse effects and allergies
Use of fenugreek has potential for serious adverse effects, as it may be unsafe for women with hormone-sensitive cancers. Fenugreek is not safe for use during pregnancy, as it has possible abortifacient effects and may induce preterm uterine contractions.

Some people are allergic to fenugreek, including those with peanut allergy or chickpea allergy. Fenugreek seeds can cause diarrhea, dyspepsia, abdominal distention, flatulence, perspiration, and a maple-like smell to sweat, urine or breast milk. There is a risk of hypoglycemia particularly in people with diabetes, and it may interfere with the activity of anti-diabetic drugs.  Because of the high content of coumarin-like compounds in fenugreek, it may interfere with the activity and dosing of anticoagulants and antiplatelet drugs.

Fenugreek sprouts, cultivated from a single specific batch of seeds imported from Egypt into Germany in 2009, were implicated as the source of the 2011 outbreak of Escherichia coli O104:H4 in Germany and France. Identification of a common producer and a single batch of fenugreek seeds was evidence for the origin of the outbreaks.

See also
 Hilbah

References

External links 
 

Edible legumes
Forages
Indian spices
Iraqi cuisine
Jewish cuisine
Leaf vegetables
Nitrogen-fixing crops
Plants described in 1753
Plants used in traditional Chinese medicine
Spices
Traditional medicine in India
Trifolieae
Yemeni cuisine